Yehor Pavlovych Shalfeyev (born 3 October 1998) is a Ukrainian professional football midfielder who currently plays for Metalurh Zaporizhzhia in the Ukrainian Second League.

Career
Shalfeyev is a product of Metalurh Zaporizhhia academy.

He made his debut as a substituted player in a second half-time for Zorya Luhansk in the losing match against Dynamo Kyiv on 7 April 2018 in the Ukrainian Premier League.

References

External links
 Profile at Footballfacts (Rus)
 
 

1998 births
Living people
Footballers from Zaporizhzhia
Ukrainian footballers
Association football midfielders
FC Metalurh Zaporizhzhia players
FC Zorya Luhansk players
Ukrainian Premier League players
Ukrainian First League players
Ukrainian Second League players